Gyula is a district in eastern part of Békés County. Gyula is also the name of the town where the district seat is found. The district is located in the Southern Great Plain Statistical Region.

Geography 
Gyula District borders with Sarkad District to the north, the Romanian county of Arad to the east and south, Mezőkovácsháza District to the southwest, Békéscsaba District to the west. The number of the inhabited places in Gyula District is 4.

Municipalities 
The district has 2 towns, 1 large village and 1 village.
(ordered by population, as of 1 January 2012)

The bolded municipalities are cities, italics municipality is large village.

Demographics

In 2011, it had a population of 41,627 and the population density was 101/km².

Ethnicity
Besides the Hungarian majority, the main minorities are the Romanian (approx. 2,500), German (1,250), Roma (1,000) and Slovak (150).

Total population (2011 census): 41,627
Ethnic groups (2011 census): Identified themselves: 39,664 persons:
Hungarians: 34,700 (87.48%)
Romanians: 2,382 (6.01%)
Germans: 1,252 (3.16%)
Gypsies: 808 (2.04%)
Others and indefinable: 522 (1.32%)
Approx. 2,000 persons in Gyula District did not declare their ethnic group at the 2011 census.

Religion
Religious adherence in the county according to 2011 census:

Catholic – 8,722 (Roman Catholic – 8,474; Greek Catholic – 244);
Reformed – 6,191;
Orthodox – 1,431;
Evangelical – 625;
other religions – 1,183; 
Non-religious – 11,197; 
Atheism – 571;
Undeclared – 11,707.

Gallery

See also
List of cities and towns of Hungary

References

External links
 Postal codes of the Gyula District

Districts in Békés County